Katie Daffan (July 29, 1874 – May 22, 1951) was an American newspaper columnist and author.

A sympathizer of the Confederacy, Daffan was president of the Texas division of the United Daughters of the Confederacy. She helped organize reunions of the Texas Brigade, a brigade of the Confederate States Army.

Books
New Orleans (1906)
Woman in History (1908)
My Father as I Remember Him (1908)
The Woman on Pine Springs Road (1910)
As Thinketh a Woman (1911), poems
Texas Hero Stories (1912)
History of the United States (1924)
Texas Heros (1924)

References

External links
 Katie Daffan Collection Inventory Texas Woman's University.

1874 births
1951 deaths
People from Brenham, Texas
American non-fiction writers
People from Ennis, Texas
20th-century American writers
20th-century American women writers